Bernadett Biacsi (born 29 December 1985) is a Hungarian Paralympic athlete competing mainly in category T20 middle-distance events. Biacsi competed at the 2012 Summer Paralympics in London, finishing fourth in the 1,500m race in her classification. Biacsi won the silver medal at the European Championship in the 1,500 metres in 2014. She followed this with a second silver in the 800m, two years later at the 2016 European Championships in Grosseto. Biacsi's twin sister, Ilona is also a T20 middle-distance athlete and the two were chosen to be joint flag bearers at the opening ceremony of the 2012 Paralympics.

References

External links 
 

Paralympic athletes of Hungary
Athletes (track and field) at the 2012 Summer Paralympics
Living people
Hungarian female middle-distance runners
1985 births
People from Szeged
Athletes (track and field) at the 2020 Summer Paralympics